Mark Tweedie (born September 29, 1956) is an American politician who served in the Connecticut House of Representatives from the 13th district from 2015 to 2019.

References

1956 births
Living people
Republican Party members of the Connecticut House of Representatives